Kutlwelo Mpolokang (born 9 February 1996) is a Motswana footballer who currently plays for Township Rollers.

References

1996 births
Living people
Botswana footballers
Botswana international footballers
Sankoyo Bush Bucks F.C. players
Extension Gunners FC players
Gaborone United S.C. players
Jwaneng Galaxy F.C. players
Township Rollers F.C. players
Association football midfielders